Hou Zhihui (born 18 March 1997) is a Chinese weightlifter, Olympic champion, World champion, and two-time Asian champion competing in the women's 49 kg category.

As of 2021, she has set eleven senior world records throughout her career.

Career
She competed at the 2018 World Weightlifting Championships in the 49 kg division, winning silvers medals in all lifts, and setting two world records in the total.

In 2019 she competed at the 2019 IWF World Cup held in Fuzhou, China, in the 49 kg category. She swept gold medals in all lifts setting new world records in the snatch and total.

In 2021 at the 2020 Summer Olympics, she won China's second gold medal in women's 49 kg weightlifting, setting new Olympic records in the snatch, clean and jerk, and overall total, with 210 kilograms, which is three short of her world record from the 2020 Asian Weightlifting Championships.

She won the bronze medal in the women's 49kg event at the 2022 World Weightlifting Championships held in Bogotá, Colombia.

Major results

References

External links

1997 births
Living people
People from Chenzhou
Chinese female weightlifters
World Weightlifting Championships medalists
Weightlifters at the 2020 Summer Olympics
Olympic gold medalists for China
Olympic weightlifters of China
Olympic medalists in weightlifting
Medalists at the 2020 Summer Olympics
21st-century Chinese women